Sherry J. Gay-Dagnogo (born January 30, 1967) is a current Detroit School Board Member elected citywide, a former Democratic member of the Michigan House of Representatives, of which represented the 8th District 2015-2021.  The 8th House District includes portions of Northwest Detroit, including the Bethune, Brightmoor, Castle Rouge, College Park, and Grandmont-Rosedale communities. In January 2020, Gay-Dagnogo announced that she was forming a political committee to explore the possibility of running for Mayor of Detroit in 2021.

Personal life
Gay-Dagnogo is the mother of one son, Jordan. She is a current resident, and former Vice President, of the North Rosedale Park Civic Association.

Education
Gay-Dagnogo attended Oakland Community College in 2002. From 2001–2004, she attended Wayne State University, receiving her Bachelor of Science and Master in Education in Instructional Technology.

Professional career
From November 1993 to January 2002, Gay-Dagnogo worked as the Legislative Assistant & Training Manager for Detroit City Councilman Clyde Cleveland.

From 1993 to 2002, Gay-Dagnogo worked for the City of Detroit, managing technology training for City Council employees.

From 2004 to October 2010, Gay-Dagnogo taught seventh and eighth grade science at Detroit Edison Public Schools Academy, a charter school that opened in 1998.

From October 2010 to January 2012, Gay-Dagnogo worked for the United Way of South East Michigan, as the Director of Educational Performance.

Gay-Dagnogo currently works as a political campaign manager, having most recently run the Detroit "Proposal S" bond referendum.

Political career

Legislative accomplishments
As of 2018, Gay-Dagnogo has not sponsored a bill that has been signed into law.

2012 election
Incumbent State Rep. David Nathan defeated Gay-Dagnogo in the 2012 House District 8 Primary Election. She received 34 percent of the vote in her unsuccessful bid.

2014 election
Gay-Dagnogo won a competitive 2014 Democratic Primary, defeating five other candidates with 45 percent of the vote. Gay-Dagnogo defeated Christopher Ewald in the General Election.

2016 election
Gay-Dagnogo ran unopposed in the 2016 House District 8 Democratic primary. She defeated Jennifer Rynicki in the General Election.

2018 election
In 2018, Gay-Dagnogo joined a crowded field of Democrats vying for the U.S. House seat formerly held by longtime Rep. John Conyers Jr., who resigned in December 2017 amid allegations of sexual harassment. She ultimately pulled out of the race.

In the news

Investment property mysteriously demolished
On September 30, the Detroit Free Press reported that a home in Detroit owned by Gay-Dagnogo had been demolished. Gay-Dagnogo purchased the property in 2019, through her nonprofit, Coalition to Integrate Technology and Education. Assessor records show the nonprofit purchased the house for $1,000 on July 25, 2018, from the Detroit Land Bank Authority.

A review of the city's data portal website by the Free Press found no record of a planned or completed demolition of the property, located at 14567 Minock St. Detroit Building Authority Director Tyrone Clifton stated that the demolition "was not ordered, directed or funded by the city." "There also was no permit pulled by any private party for demolition at this address," Clifton said. "At this time, we are actively investigating to see if we can help determine who was responsible."

The property next door to Gay-Dagnogo’s, located at 14561 Minock St., had previously been demolished on July 11 by Adamo Group after it was damaged by a fire. Gay-Dagnogo’s property also sustained damage in that fire. The blaze burned the roof of the home and melted the vinyl siding.

When questioned about the demolition, Adamo’s attorney, Christian Hauser, stated "Adamo had absolutely nothing to do with the demolition of the structure at 14567 Minock." Hauser stated that Adamo had a photo of the house still standing on July 30 when they performed a site visit after demolishing the home next door.

In October 2019, the Free Press learned that debris from the home was found at a landfill 21 miles away in western Wayne County. The Woodland Meadows landfill, owned by Waste Management, informed the Detroit Police Department the debris was disposed at their facility located in Wayne, Michigan, in Van Buren Township.

Waste Management spokeswoman Tanisha Sanders confirmed the discovery. Sanders stated that while Waste Management knows who hauled the materials to the landfill, they are not certain of who was actually responsible for the demolition. Sanders declined to share the name of the company. "It doesn't necessarily mean that the person who hauled it demolished it," Sanders said.

In October 2019, Detroit Police Chief James Craig announced that Sherman Gipson, owner of Gipson Brothers Trucking of southwest Detroit, told police he was responsible for the demolition. During the news conference, Craig also stated that after the fire, police learned that Gay-Dagnogo sought quotes from different companies to renovate her house or demolish it. Gay-Dagnogo stated that she did not disclose this information to the police when interviewed, because she did not consider this information to be "relevant" to their investigation.

Craig criticized Gay-Dagnogo's decision, stating: "Had we gotten information that there were bids solicited, we probably would have located that suspect within 24 to 48 hours.”

During an October 30 special session of the Wrecking Board of Examiners, Harvey Gipson, of Gipson Trucking, told the board a man from Nate’s Landscaping told him to tear down 14567 Minock in Detroit. So he did. He told the board he had no legal documentation showing he was supposed to.

When 7 Action News asked Nate’s Landscaping about the statement, the company confirmed that it had solicited quotes for the demolition of that property, but never pulled the permit or asked for it to be done.

Seeking clemency for Kwame Kilpatrick
In February 2020, Gay-Dagnogo lobbied President Donald Trump to grant clemency to federal inmate Kwame Kilpatrick. Gay-Dagnogo and others were at the White House for a reception celebrating Black History Month.

Kilpatrick, 49, resigned as Detroit mayor in 2008 following a text-messaging sex scandal involving his chief of staff. In 2013, a federal judge sentenced the Democrat to 28 years in prison for extortion, bribery, conspiracy and other crimes during his years in office. He is due to be released in 2037.

Noticeably absent from her letter to the President was mention of Bobby Ferguson, an African American man and Kilpatrick's co-conspirator, who received a 21 year sentence for related crimes.

Electoral history

See also
Michigan House of Representatives
Michigan Democratic Party

References

External links
https://www.followthemoney.org/

1967 births
20th-century African-American people
20th-century African-American women
21st-century African-American politicians
21st-century African-American women
21st-century American politicians
21st-century American women politicians
African-American state legislators in Michigan
African-American women in politics
Candidates in the 2022 United States House of Representatives elections
Living people
Democratic Party members of the Michigan House of Representatives
Politicians from Detroit
Wayne State University alumni
Women state legislators in Michigan